Chandrmondol Sobhon Bhagiawati,Wichitwathakan, Wibun. Satri sayam nai adit [Feminine Siamese in the past]. Bangkok : Sangsan Books, 1999, p. 157  the Princess Wisutkrasat (24 April 1855 — 14 May 1863) also known as Princess Fa-ying or Somdetch Chow Fa-ying ("Royal highness Princess") was a Princess of Siam and daughter of King Mongkut and Queen Debsirindra.

Biography 
Princess Chandrmondol was born at the Grand Palace in Bangkok, on 24 April 1855, the only daughter of King Mongkut and Queen Debsirindra. Chandrmondol had an elder brother, Prince Chulalongkorn and younger brother, Prince Chaturonrasmi and Prince Bhanurangsi Savangwongse.

She was initially named Chandrmondol, and changed to Chandrmondol Sobhon Bhagiawati in 1862 by order of King Mongkut. her father called her "Nang Nu" ("the little daughter"), and Palace officials affectionately called her "Fa-ying".

Princess Chandrmondol was tutored in the English language and Western manners by Anna Leonowens.

She died of cholera on May 14, 1863, and was buried in Sanam Luang in Bangkok. When Chulalongkorn was crowned in 1867, she was posthumously given the title the Princess Wisutkrasat ( "the Lady of Purity") on 3 May 1884.

Legacy 
She was a "Princess Fâ-ying" a character in Anna and the King. Wisut Kasat Road was another name for Princess Chandrmondol.

Ancestry

References

External links 
 Princess Fa-Ying on IMDb

19th-century Thai royalty who died as children
1855 births
1863 deaths
Thai female Chao Fa
People from Bangkok
Children of Mongkut
Deaths from cholera
19th-century Chakri dynasty
Daughters of kings